June Chadwick (born 30 November 1951, Warwickshire) is an English film and television actress. Her best-known television roles are as Lydia in the science fiction TV series V: The Series, and as Lt. Joanna Parisi on the third season of the series Riptide.

Her best-known film credit is as Jeanine Pettibone in This Is Spinal Tap (1984).

Filmography
Chadwick's notable works are:
The Golden Lady (1979)
Forbidden World (1982)
Sparkling Cyanide (1983)
This Is Spinal Tap (1984)
Magnum, P.I. (1984)
The A-Team (1985)
V (1984-1985)
Riptide (1985-1986)
Macgyver (1986)
Jumpin' Jack Flash (1986)
Matlock (1989)
The Evil Below (1989)
Dr. Alice Davis on the short-lived television series, Going to Extremes (1992)
Facing the Enemy (2001)
Voice of Dr. Sheila Thatcher in the video game Star Trek: Away Team.

References

External links

1951 births
Living people
English film actresses
English television actresses
English voice actresses
People from Warwickshire